René Pinto may refer to:

 René Pinto (footballer) (born 1965), Chilean footballer
 René Pinto (baseball) (born 1996), Venezuelan baseball player